The Crimea campaign was an eight-month-long campaign by Axis forces to conquer the Crimean Peninsula, and was the scene of some of the bloodiest battles on the Eastern Front during World War II. The German, Romanian, and defending Soviet troops suffered heavy casualties as the Axis forces tried to advance through the Isthmus of Perekop linking the Crimean peninsula to the mainland at Perekop, from summer of 1941 through to the first half of 1942.

From 26 September 1941 the German 11th Army and troops from the Romanian Third Army and Fourth Army were involved in the fighting, opposed by the Red Army's 51st Army and elements of the Black Sea Fleet. After the campaign, the peninsula was occupied by Army Group A with the 17th Army as its major subordinate formation.

Once the Axis (German and Romanian troops) broke through, they occupied most of Crimea, with the exception of the city of Sevastopol, which was given the title of Hero City for its resistance, and Kerch, which was recaptured by the Soviets during an amphibious operation near the end of 1941 and then taken once again by the Germans during Operation Bustard Hunt on 8 May. The Siege of Sevastopol lasted 250 days from 30 October 1941 until 4 July 1942, when the Axis finally captured the city.

In the early hours of 6 November, the Romanian submarine Delfinul, commanded by Constantin Costăchescu, torpedoed and sank the Soviet 1,975-ton cargo ship Uralets four miles South of Yalta. The submarine was subsequently attacked by Soviet forces but she followed a route along the Turkish coast and managed to evade up to 80 depth charges, before safely arriving in the port of Constanța on 7 November.

Sevastopol, the main object of the campaign, was surrounded by German forces and assaulted on 30 October 1941. German troops were repulsed by a Soviet counterattack. Later, many troops who had been evacuated from Odessa contributed to the defence of Sevastopol. The Germans then began an encirclement of the city. Other attacks on 11 November and 30 November, in the eastern and southern sections of the city, failed. German forces were then reinforced by several artillery regiments, one of which included the railway gun Schwerer Gustav. Another attack on 17 December was repulsed at the last moment with the help of reinforcements and Soviet troops landed on the Kerch peninsula the day after Christmas, to relieve Sevastopol. The Soviet forces remained on the peninsula until a 9 April German counterattack. They held on for another month before being eliminated on 18 May. With the distraction removed, German forces renewed their assault on Sevastopol, penetrating the inner defensive lines on 29 June. Soviet commanders had been flown out or evacuated by submarine towards the end of the siege and the city surrendered on 4 July 1942, although some Soviet troops held out in caves outside of the city until 9 July.

In 1944, Crimea was recaptured by troops of the 4th Ukrainian Front during the Crimean Offensive (8 April 1944 – 12 May 1944) and its three sub-operations:
 Kerch–Eltigen Operation (31 October 1943 – 11 December 1943)
 Perekop–Sevastopol Offensive Operation (8 April 1944 – 12 May 1944)
 Kerch–Sevastopol Offensive Operation (11 April 1944 – 12 May 1944)

Notes

Bibliography
 Bishop, Chris, The Military Atlas of World War II, Igloo Books, London, 2005 
 http://www.soldat.ru/spravka/freedom/1-ssr-3.html Dudarenko, M.L., Perechnev, Yu.G., Yeliseev, V.T., et.el., Reference guide "Liberation of cities": reference for liberation of cities during the period of the Great Patriotic War 1941–1945, Moscow, 1985 (Дударенко, М.Л., Перечнев, Ю.Г., Елисеев, В.Т. и др., сост. Справочник «Освобождение городов: Справочник по освобождению городов в период Великой Отечественной войны 1941–1945»)
 Keegan, John, The Times Atlas of the Second World War, Crescent Books, New York

World War II sites in Ukraine
World War II sites of Nazi Germany
Military campaigns involving Germany
Crimea in World War II
Military history of Romania during World War II
Conflicts in 1941
Conflicts in 1942
Battles and operations of the Soviet–German War
Romania–Soviet Union relations
Naval battles of World War II involving Romania
October 1941 events
November 1941 events